Samantha "Sam" Holland is a British sculptor.  

Holland studied Fine Art Sculpture at the City & Guilds of London Art School gaining a first class degree. In 2001 she became a member of the Royal Society of British Sculptors.

Her commissions include statues of the founder of The Football League, William McGregor at Villa Park, Birmingham Dick Evans at Moelfre, Anglesey, the RNLI memorial sculpture outside the RNLI Headquarters in Poole, Dorset and a statue of politician Barbara Castle in Jubilee Square, Blackburn.

Personal life

Holland is married and has two sons, Tom and Sid.

References

Living people
British sculptors
Modern sculptors
Year of birth missing (living people)
Women sculptors